{|

{{Infobox ship characteristics
|Hide header=
|Header caption=
|Ship class=
|Ship tonnage=
|Ship displacement=* standard
 trial
|Ship length=* overall
 waterline
|Ship beam= 
|Ship height= 
|Ship draught= 
|Ship draft= 
|Ship propulsion= 2 × Kampon Mk.22 Model 6 diesels, 2 shafts, 
|Ship power= 
|Ship speed= 
|Ship range=  at 
|Ship boats=
|Ship troops=
|Ship complement= 59
|Ship capacity=
|Ship crew=
|Ship EW=
|Ship armament=*2 × 40 mm heavy machine guns
36 × depth charges
2 × Type 94 depth charge projectors
1 × depth charge thrower
1 × Type 93 active sonar
1 × Type 93 hydrophone
No.4, November 19442 × 40 mm heavy machine guns
3 × Type 96 25 mm AA guns
36 × depth charges
2 × Type 94 depth charge projectors
2 × depth charge throwers (estimate)
1 × 13-Gō surface search radar
1 × Type 3 active sonar
1 × Type 93 hydrophone
|Ship armour=
}}

History
SCD 21 was at the time assigned to Rear Admiral Hirose Sueto's 2nd Base Force under Vice Admiral Ibō Takahashi's Third Fleet.

References

Additional references
 
 
 

1938 ships
No.4-class submarine chasers